Stephanie Poetri Dougharty (born 20 May 2000) is an Indonesian singer-songwriter and record producer. She is currently signed to record label 88rising.

Early life
Stephanie Poetri Dougharty was born on 20 May 2000 in Jakarta, Indonesia, to an Indonesian mother, Titi Dwi Jayati, and an American father, Andrew Dougharty, who was the Head of School of the school she attended, Global Jaya International School. She was raised in her hometown Jakarta and grew up with 2 half-sisters and a half-brother from her mother's side.

Career

2015–2019: Career beginnings
Poetri's first major work came in 2015 when she, along with Goodbye Felicia, performed a cover of "Bimbang" for the Indonesian teen film Ada Apa Dengan Cinta? 2.

In 2019, Poetri released her debut single titled "Appreciate." She released two versions of the song; one in Indonesian and one in English.

2019–2021: "I Love You 3000"
Poetri's breakthrough as an artist came with the release of her single, "I Love You 3000," on 3 June 2019. She revealed that inspiration from the song came from an Instagram Q&A with her followers, along with the release of Avengers: Endgame a week before the Q&A. The song amassed over 425 million streams online, topping Spotify’s Global Viral 50 for over 4 weeks. The song also resulted in her winning "Best New Asian Artist – Indonesia" at the 2019 Mnet Asian Music Awards.
A remix of the song, titled "I Love You 3000 II", featured Got7 member Jackson Wang. It was released on 88rising's Head in the Clouds II album, hitting the Billboard social charts in China. The pair also collaborated to create a music video, garnering over 14 million views on YouTube.

In February 2020, Poetri released two new singles, titled "Do You Love Me" and "Touch." Both music videos have a combined view count of over 10 million on YouTube. Poetri has described the songs as "anti-romance" songs, saying "In my opinion, [the songs] have a little bit more depth and they're less storyline-based, but still very much a kind of story that some people can relate to."

In April 2020, Poetri released a single titled "Straight To You." Speaking on the music video, Poetri stated "I decided to do a fun project where I used a green screen to make a video at home since we couldn't really shoot a full-on production during this time. I got very into it and made a full music video all by myself in my room and edited it really intensely over 48 hours!"

In December 2020, Poetri released her single "Selfish." It was the first and only single to be released from her debut EP AM:PM.

2021–present: AM:PM
On 12 March 2021, Poetri released her debut EP AM:PM.

Personal life
Poetri moved to Los Angeles, California in November 2019 to pursue her music career. However, as a result of the COVID-19 pandemic, she made the decision to move back to Jakarta to be with her family.

Poetri has cited Alec Benjamin, Finneas, Jeremy Zucker, and fellow 88rising artist NIKI as musical inspirations. She also enjoys K-pop, citing Blackpink, Got7, and TWICE as some of her favorite groups.

Poetri began streaming on Twitch in October 2020, where she does gaming and music streams.

Discography

Extended plays

Singles

Awards and nominations

References

Living people
2000 births
21st-century Indonesian women singers
English-language singers from Indonesia
Musicians from Jakarta
Twitch (service) streamers
Indonesian emigrants to the United States